Professor Peter English (9 March 1937 – 3 January 2009) was a scientist, shinty player and social historian from Lochletter, Glen Urquhart, by the shores of Loch Ness, Highland, Scotland.

Career
English was an expert in agricultural science, in particular in the field of animal welfare.  He was an employee of Aberdeen University from 1961 until 2002, becoming professor of animal science and husbandry in 1998.  He was on the UK Farm Animal Welfare Council for nine years.

His book The Sow - Improving Her Efficiency has been translated into 23 languages.

Shinty
English was well regarded for his contributions to the sport of shinty.  As a young man he played in a successful Glenurquhart Shinty Club side in the 1950s and early 1960s before moving to Aberdeen, where he was a founder of Aberdeen Camanachd, the Aberdeen University Shinty Club.

His big contribution to the game of shinty was the establishment of the Shinty Yearbook in 1971 and publication continues to this day.  He was also a vice-president of the Camanachd Association, the governing body of shinty, for 10 years.

As well as his writings about agriculture and shinty he also produced a history of Loch Hourn and Arnisdale.  Before his death he had returned to Glen Urquhart where he was once again involved with Glenurquhart Shinty Club.

Works
 The Sow - Improving Her Efficiency (Ipswich: Farming Press, 1977) 
 Glen Urquhart : Its Places, People, Neighbours and Its Shinty in the Last 100 Years and More (Aberdeen: Arnisdale, 1985) OCLC 13398228
 The Growing and Finishing Pig [et al.] (Ipswich: Farming Press, 1988) 
 Stockmanship : Improving the Care of the Pig and Other Livestock [et al.] (Ipswich: Farming Press, 1992) 
 Arnisdale and Loch Hourn : The Clachans, People, Memories and the Future (Arnisdale and Loch Hourn Community Council, 2000) 
 A Bridge to the Past : An Oral History of Families of Upper GlenUrquhart (Inverness : Speedprint, 2009)

References

1937 births
2009 deaths
Shinty players
Sportspeople from Highland (council area)
Academics of the University of Aberdeen